The Grammy Award for Best Jazz Fusion Performance was an award given to a song or album for excellence in the jazz fusion genre, a combination of rock and jazz. It was given at the Grammy Awards, which began in 1958 under the name Gramophone Awards. Honors in several categories are presented at the ceremony annually by the National Academy of Recording Arts and Sciences of the United States to "honor artistic achievement, technical proficiency and overall excellence in the recording industry, without regard to album sales or chart position".

Originally called the Grammy Award for Best Jazz Fusion Performance, Vocal or Instrumental, the award was first presented to the jazz band Weather Report at the 22nd Grammy Awards in 1980 for the album 8:30. In 1988, the category name changed to Best Jazz Fusion Performance and was moved to a newly created Fusion field. The category name was retired before the 33rd Grammy Awards (1992) with the addition of the award for Best Contemporary Jazz Performance (currently known as Best Contemporary Jazz Album).

The Pat Metheny Group holds the record for the most wins in this category, with a total of five. David Sanborn is the only other musician to win the award more than once, with two. The composition "Birdland", written by Weather Report, earned two musicians the award: The Manhattan Transfer won in 1981 and Quincy Jones won in 1991 for the version that appears on the compilation album Back on the Block. The award went to artists or groups originating from the United States each year it was presented. Lyle Mays holds the record for the most nominations, with eight (including five with the Pat Metheny group, two as a solo artist, and one shared with Metheny, of which five came in consecutive nominations between 1981 and 1985). The group Spyro Gyra holds the record for the most nominations without a win, with six. In 1990, Terri Lyne Carrington became the first solo female artist to be nominated for the award. No female artists were nominated in 1991, the final year the award was presented, making Carrington the only female solo artist to be nominated throughout the category's lifetime.

Recipients

 Each year is linked to the article about the Grammy Awards held that year.

See also

 List of Grammy Award categories
 List of jazz fusion musicians
 List of jazz fusion recordings

References

General
  Note: User must select the "Jazz" category as the genre under the search feature.

Specific

External links
 Official site of the Grammy Awards
 Grammy.com: 23rd Annual Grammy Awards – Best Jazz Fusion Performance

 
1980 establishments in the United States
1991 disestablishments in the United States
Awards disestablished in 1991
Awards established in 1980
Jazz Fusion Performance